Spuyten Duyvil is a neighborhood of the Bronx, New York City. It is bounded on the north by Riverdale, on the east by Kingsbridge, on the south by the Harlem River, and on the west by the Hudson River, although some consider it to be the southernmost part of Riverdale.

Etymology

The area is named after Spuyten Duyvil Creek. "Spuyten Duyvil" may be literally translated as "Spouting Devil" or Spuitende Duivel in Dutch, a reference to the strong and wild tidal currents found at that location.  It may also be translated as "Spewing Devil" or "Spinning Devil", or more loosely as "Devil's Whirlpool" or "Devil's Spate." Spui is a Dutch word involving outlets for water. Historian Reginald Pelham Bolton, however, argues that the phrase means "spouting meadow", referring to a fresh-water spring at Inwood Hill.

An additional translation, "to spite the Devil" or "in spite of the devil", was popularized by a story in Washington Irving's A Knickerbocker's History of New York published in 1809. Set in the 1660s, the story tells of trumpeter Antony Van Corlear summoned by "Peter de Groodt" to warn settlers of an attempted British invasion, with Corlear attempting to swim across the "Harlean river" from Fort Amsterdam to the Bronx mainland "in spite of the devil (spyt den duyvel)", Irving writes. The treacherous current pulled him under and he lost his life. This resulted in the name "Spuyten Duyvil" for "the adjoining promontory, which projects into the Hudson."

An extensive appendix to Studies in Etymology and Etiology: With Emphasis on Germanic, Jewish, Romance and Slavic Languages (2009) by David L. Gold, which includes commentary by Rob Rentenaar, professor of onomastics at the University of Amsterdam, goes into great detail about all the various translations for "Spuyten Duyvil" which have been mooted over the years.  Rentenaar concludes that "Duyvil" means "devil", either literally or in a transferred sense, but he could not determine what the intended meaning of "Spuyten" was because of the many variants that have been used throughout history.<ref>Gold, David L. and Rentenaar, Rob "Appendix 1: On the Etymology of the New York City Place Names Gramercy Park, Hell Gate, and Spuyten Duyvil , the New Jersey Place Name Barnegat, and Regional American English Fly ~ Vlei ~ Vley ~ Vlaie ~ Vly" in Gold, David L. (2009) Studies in Etymology and Etiology: With Emphasis on Germanic, Jewish, Romance and Slavic Languages. Universidad de Alicante.    pp.145-146 </ref>

The creek was referred to as Shorakapok'' by Lenape Native Americans in the area, translated as "the sitting down place" or the place between the ridges".

History

In the late 17th century, Frederick Philipse, the lord of Philipse Manor in Westchester County, received permission to construct a bridge across Spuyten Duyvil Creek and charge tolls.  "King's Bridge", which was located roughly south of and parallel to where West 230th Street lies today, opened in 1693.

Development of the neighborhood began in the latter half of the 19th century once the New York Central and Hudson River Railroad came through.  The tracks originally crossed Spuyten Duyvil Creek and into Manhattan on the west side, but Cornelius Vanderbilt wanted to consolidate his railroad operations into one terminal, so he had tracks laid along the north side of the Harlem River so that trains coming south from Albany could join with the Harlem and New Haven lines and come into Manhattan down Fourth Avenue into his new Grand Central Depot. This is the route still used by Metro-North today.

Through the 1920s development of the Spuyten Duyvil neighborhood continued. Large high-rise apartment buildings, which later became condominiums and cooperatives, began to be built in the 1950s and continued through the 1980s, bringing in affluent families attracted by its scenic qualities, as well as by the area's closeness to desirable neighborhoods such as Fieldston and Riverdale.

On July 18, 2013, a freight train derailed near the Spuyten Duyvil station due to an excessively wide gauge at one point. No one was killed or injured. Less than six months later, on December 1, a commuter train derailment near the Spuyten Duyvil station resulted in 4 deaths and over 70 injuries, 11 of them critical. The cause of the second derailment was determined to be excessive speed.

Demographics
Based on data from the 2010 United States Census, the population of Kingsbridge and Spuyten Duyvil was 30,161, a change of 289 (1%) from the 29,872 counted in 2000.

The racial makeup of the neighborhoods were 49.3% (14,872) White, 8.9% (2,691) African American, 0.1% (40) Native American, 5.7% (1,731) Asian, 0% (15) Pacific Islander, 0.3% (98) from other races, and 1.7% (510) from two or more races. Hispanic or Latino of any race were 33.8% (10,204) of the population.

A restaurant guide once described the neighborhood as "upper middle class".

Police and crime
Spuyten Duyvil is patrolled by the 50th Precinct of the NYPD, located at 3450 Kingsbridge Avenue. The 50th Precinct ranked 13th safest out of 69 patrol areas for per-capita crime in 2010.

The 50th Precinct has a lower crime rate than in the 1990s, with crimes across all categories having decreased by 69.9% between 1990 and 2022. The precinct reported three murders, 22 rapes, 185 robberies, 213 felony assaults, 126 burglaries, 695 grand larcenies, and 288 grand larcenies auto in 2022.

Library
The New York Public Library (NYPL) operates the Spuyten Duyvil branch at 650 West 235th Street. The one-story branch opened in 1971 and was designed by Giorgio Cavaglieri.

Transportation
Spuyten Duyvil is the location of the Spuyten Duyvil train station, which is served by the Hudson Line of the Metro-North Railroad, providing service into Grand Central Terminal and north into Westchester County. Spuyten Duyvil Bridge, a railroad swing bridge that carries Amtrak's Empire Corridor line between New York City and Albany, spans Spuyten Duyvil Creek. The north end of the Henry Hudson Bridge connects the neighborhood to the island of Manhattan via the Henry Hudson Parkway.

Hudson Rail Link connects the Metro-North station to the surrounding area, with Routes J, K, L, and M serving Spuyten Duyvil.

Points of interest
Edgehill Church of Spuyten Duyvil (United Church of Christ) was built in 1888-89 as a chapel of the Riverdale Presbyterian Church located nearby, and was designed by Francis H. Kimball in an eclectic mix of styles: Romanesque Revival, Tudor Revival and Shingle style. The church was designated a New York City landmark in 1980.
Henry Hudson Park features a  bronze statue of Henry Hudson sculpted by Karl Bitter and Karl Gruppe on top of a  Doric column by architect Walter Cook of the firm of Babb, Cook & Willard.
Villa Charlotte Bronte is an apartment house built in 1926 and designed by Robert Gardner, which overlooks the Hudson and Harlem Rivers.

Notable people
 Alexander Calder (1898–1976), sculptor who is best known for his innovative mobiles.
 William Sergeant Kendall  (1869–1938), artist.
 Georgina Klitgaard (1893–1976), artist known for panoramic landscape paintings
 Joan Tetzel (1921–1977), actress.

See also
 Hell Gate
 List of place names of Dutch origin
 John Jay McKelvey, Sr., Attorney, Park District Protection League Trustee.

References 
Notes

Bibliography

External links

 
Neighborhoods in the Bronx